Falling off a Clef (2004) is the first full-length album by Vince Dicola, composer to the music score of The Transformers: The Movie. It is now commercially available to buy the album on the Travis Dickenson website. The album is a selection of pieces from a project Vince and Kenny Meriedeth were approached to work on called Sci-Fighter. A full statement from Vince is posted on the Travis Dickenson website.

Track listing 
(Tracks 3-23 from Sci-Fighter.)
 Castle of the Gods Suite
 Alien Match
 The Exhibition
 I'm Going in
 Daddy's Home
 We Need to Talk
 Into the Game
 Choose Your Level (excerpt)
 Something's Wrong
 Look Out!
 Defeat the Karate Master
 The Monkey Man
 King Fu Catfight
 Help Your Brother
 The Path to the Portal
 Dance of the Scorpion Queen
 Dream of the Dragon
 Rumble Inna Gadda
 You're Not My Father
 Imaginary Ninjas
 Sci-Fighter Suite
 The Master Returns
 Fallen Angel
 FS #7 / Variation on a Theme
 A.P.B.
 Castle of the Gods (theme variation)

2004 albums
Vince DiCola albums